Pomacentrus caeruleus, the cerulean damselfish, is a species of damselfish from the Western Indian Ocean. It occasionally makes its way into the aquarium trade.

References
 

caeruleus
Fish described in 1825
Taxa named by Jean René Constant Quoy
Taxa named by Joseph Paul Gaimard